John Zhang may refer to:

 John J. Zhang, medical scientist who made important contributions in fertility research
 John X. J. Zhang, Chinese-American engineer
 Xinlei "John" Zhang, an adult perpetrator in the 2015 Rowland Heights, California bullying incident